Fires of Faith is a 1919 American silent drama film directed by Edward José and written by Beulah Marie Dix and Charles E. Whittaker. The film stars Catherine Calvert, Eugene O'Brien, Rubye De Remer, Helen Dunbar, Theodore Roberts, Charles Ogle, and Clarence Geldart. The film with a plot concerning The Salvation Army and World War I was released on August 3, 1919, by Paramount Pictures.

Plot
As described in a film magazine, Elizabeth Blake (Calvert), who has been reared in the country since she was a foundling, is lured to her ruin by an unscrupulous landlord's agent. She runs away to the city and, after many adventures, is rescued by The Salvation Army and made a member of their order. When her county lover Luke (Anderson) finds her, she is about to embark for France, so he enlists in the army in the hope of meeting her in Europe. Harry Hammond (O'Brien), a son of wealth who has scorned The Salvation Army, is shanghaied and taken to London, where a representative of the order persuades him to enlist in the aviation corps. His fiance Agnes Traverse (De Remer), learning of his whereabouts, also dons the scarlet ribboned bonnet and arrives in France. Harry is wounded and Elizabeth, who has learned to love him, remains behind with him when the Allies retreat. Luke arrives and casts his lot with them, and the three hide in the cellar of a deserted chateau taken by the Germans. They resist capture until rescued by the American forces. A military wedding ceremony unites Harry and Agnes and Luke and Elizabeth.

Cast
Catherine Calvert as Elizabeth Blake
Eugene O'Brien as Harry Hammond
Rubye De Remer as Agnes Traverse
Helen Dunbar as Mrs. Traverse
Theodore Roberts as Salvationist
Charles Ogle as William Booth
Clarence Geldart as Railton
James Neill as Booth's Secretary
Edythe Chapman as Mrs. Booth
Pat Moore as Jules, Pierre's Grandson
Fred Huntley as Joe Lee
Lucille Ward as Mrs. Lee
Mowbray Berkeley as Mark Southard
Robert Anderson as Luke Barlow
Evangeline Booth as herself

References

External links 

 

1919 films
1910s English-language films
Silent American drama films
1919 drama films
Paramount Pictures films
Films directed by Edward José
American black-and-white films
American silent feature films
1910s American films